Ikot Abasi may refer to:

 Ikot Abasi (village), Akwa Ibom State, Nigeria
 Ikot-Abasi, Eket, Akwa Ibom State, Nigeria
 Ikot Abasi Effiom, Akpabuyo, Cross River State, Nigeria

See also
 Abasi (disambiguation)